White Rock, is the high point on a  ridgeline in the Taconic Mountains. The ridge is located in the tri-state corner of New York, Massachusetts, and Vermont in the towns of Petersburgh, Williamstown, and Pownal.  The ridge has several distinct knobs; those with names are, from south to north: White Rocks, ; Smith Hill,  ; White Rock, the high point ; and Bald Mountain . The Snow Hole, located along the ridgeline between Bald Mountain and the White Rock, is a crevasse in which snow can be found well into the summer.

Geography

The summit and west side of the ridge are located in New York, the east side in Vermont, and the southeast  in Massachusetts.  The summit ridge is part meadow and part wooded with red spruce, balsam fir, and northern hardwood tree species. It is notable for its views of the Hoosic River valley and Hudson River Valley. The  Taconic Crest Trail traverses the mountain. Portions of the ridge are within protected conservation land, but much of it is privately owned.

The Taconic Mountains continue north from White Rock ridge across the Hoosic River valley as Mount Anthony and south over Petersburgh Pass as Mount Raimer. The White Rock ridge is flanked to the east across the Hoosic River Valley by the western escarpment of the Green Mountains. The west side of the ridge drains into the Little Hoosic River, thence into the Hoosic River, the Hudson River, and Long Island Sound. The east side drains into the Hoosic River.

References
 Massachusetts Trail Guide (2004). Boston: Appalachian Mountain Club.
 Day Hiker's Guide to Vermont 5th Edition (2006). Waterbury Center, Vermont: Green Mountain Club.

References

External links
 Berkshire Natural Resource Council.
 Rensselaer Land Trust. 
 Taconic Hiking Club
 Williamstown Rural Lands Foundation
 Williamstown Rural Lands Foundation trail map

Mountains of Berkshire County, Massachusetts
Mountains of Vermont
Taconic Mountains
Mountains of Rensselaer County, New York
Mountains of Bennington County, Vermont
Mountains of New York (state)